Union des Mouvements Sportifs de Loum (known simply as UMS de Loum) is a Cameroonian professional football club based in Loum. They are a member of the Cameroonian Football Federation and Elite One, the topflight football league of Cameroon. Currently the team plays at the Stade de Njombé.

UMS de Loum won its first Cameroon Cup in 2015, defeating Coton Sport, Canon Yaoundé and Union Douala on their way to the final where they defeated Panthère du Ndé 2–0.

Honours
Cameroon Premiere Division
Champions: 2016, 2019

Cameroon Cup
Winners: 2015

Performance in CAF competitions
CAF Champions League: 3 appearances
2017 – Preliminary Round
2019 – Preliminary Round
2020 – Preliminary Round

CAF Confederation Cup: 1 appearance
2016 – First Round

References

External links
Team profile - Soccerway.com

Football clubs in Cameroon
Association football clubs established in 2011
2011 establishments in Cameroon
Littoral Region (Cameroon)